The Academic Scientific Research Computer Network of Armenia (ASNET-AM) is the national research and education network (NREN) of Armenia. ASNET-AM was created in 1994. The structure and policy of ASNET-AM operation was developed and realized by the Institute for Informatics and Automation Problems ([ IIAP ]) of the National Academy of Sciences of Armenia.

Activity 

Main trends of ASNET-AM activity include:

 Scientific Research
 Database development and processing in various fields of science, technology, art
 Participation and support of scientific, educational, technical, cultural and other programs and projects
 IT Training and Education

Starting from 1997 biennial International Conference on Computer Science and Information Technologies (CSIT) is organized with the support of ASNET-AM.

Network Services
ASNET-AM services include:

 Permanent (wired & wireless) multiprotocol connectivity
 IPv4 & IPv6 (dual-stack) routing
 Managed and guarantied bandwidth (QoS)
 Network access via Proxy server
 Access to ArmCluster & ArmGrid
 Domain Name Service (DNS)
 E-Mail services (SMTP, POP, IMAP), Webmail, Mailing Lists
 Internet accessible Information and Database Systems
 Secure Data Transmission (VPN, VTUN, EoIP, IP-IP, VLAN, IPVLAN)
 Tele-education and Tele-conferencing, Virtual Desktop
 Dial-in
 Mail Informer service & WebSMS service
 Network monitoring (Nfsen, Nagios, Cacti, Weathermap, Ntop, Dude)
 Web Hosting (HTTP, HTTPS)
 Server/Router installation and maintenance
 Archive Backup
 Antivirus, Antispam, Antispyware support
 User Support & Consulting
 IT Training & Education
 Media streaming (Video/Audion Webcast)
 Mobile broadband 3G access
 Eduroam.am service

Networking

ASNET-AM develops and provides advanced network services to the Academic, Research and Education communities of Armenia. The network interconnects about 60 scientific, research, educational, cultural and other organisations in 5 cities of Armenia, such as Yerevan, Ashtarak, Byurakan, Abovian, Gyumri, integrating them with the Pan-European Research and Education Network, GEANT.
ASNET-AM network in Yerevan consists of dark fiber infrastructure with current link bandwidth from 100 Mbit/s to 10 Gbit/s.

Clustering/GRID

ASNET-AM supported the creation of first and most powerful supercomputer center in the field of science and education in Armenia - ArmCluster established in 2004. Currently ASNET-AM serves as the foundation for advanced computing applications in Armenia and provides its infrastructure for ArmGrid [] backbone network. ASNET-AM participates in the HP-SEE, High-Performance Computing Infrastructure for South East Europe's Research Communities EU project that will link existing and upcoming HPC facilities in South East Europe in a common infrastructure, and it will provide operational solutions for it.

International activities

ASNET-AM participates actively in international projects.

ASNET-AM participates in Terena Compendium.

References

Internet in Armenia
National research and education networks
Telecommunications in Armenia